Billie Idle (stylized as BILLIE IDLE®) was a Japanese alternative idol girl group founded in 2015. They debuted on April 1, 2015, with the album, Idle Gossip. They disbanded at the end of 2019.

History 
On Juy 8, 2014, during the disbandment concert of BiS, First Summer Uika and Hirano Nozomi announced their plans to form a new group and intention to hold auditions. In January 2015 Momose Momo and Yasui Yuuhi joined the group. The group made their debut as Billie Idle in March 2015, with the releases of "Anarchy in the music scene". Their debut album, Idle Gossip, was released in April, followed by their second album, Rock "N" Roll Idle in September.

In Summer 2016, Yasui Yuuhi quit the group due to health issues, and Momose Momo's sister joined as Akira in September of the same year. In October, their third album, Bi Bi Bi Bi Bi, was released.

In April 2017, the group released a compilation album, Billied Idle, and a live album, Launching Out. Their single "My Way" was released in August. The group's fourth album, Last Album was released in November.

In March 2018, they released "P.S.R.I.P". In May, former BiS member Pour Lui was announced to be joining as a new member from June 6, 2018. The group's second compilation album, Billied Idle 2.0, was released in July. Their fifth album, Not Idol, was released in November.

In February 2019, the group released the single, "Soshite, mata..", followed by "Bokura Mada Chippoke na Koro no Hanashi" in May, and finally "Last Orgy" in October. That same month, it was announced that the group would dissolve in December after their one-man tour titled "Billie Idle Tour Last Orgy". According to their producer Nigo, the reason for their disbandment were difficulties within the company and insufficient commercial success. Billie Idle's last performance on December 28 was broadcast live on AbemaTV.

Members 
First Summer Uika (2015–2019)
Hirano Nozomi (2015–2019)
Momose Momo (2015–2019)
Yasui Yuuhi (2015–2016)
Akira (2016–2019)
Pour Lui (2018–2019)

Discography

Studio albums

Compilation albums

Live albums

Singles

References

External links 
 Official website

Japanese girl groups
Japanese idol groups
Japanese pop music groups
Musical groups from Tokyo
Musical groups established in 2015
2015 establishments in Japan
Musical groups disestablished in 2019
2019 disestablishments in Japan